is the terminal station located on the Eizan Electric Railway (Eiden) Kurama Line in Sakyō-ku, Kyoto, Kyoto Prefecture, Japan.

Connecting line
Kurama-dera Cable (Sanmon Station)

The Kurama-dera cable line is a funicular that takes Kurama-dera temple visitors most of the vertical distance from the Sanmon station to the main temple complex.

It is under reconstruction until the end of March, 2016.

To get there from Kurama station.. leave the station and follow the road to where it meets the main street through Kurama village,  Turn left (uphill)  and go up the stairway to Kurama-dera  keep climbing til you pass the nursery building on the right and bathroom on left.. then next building on right is Sanmon station.

Layout
The station has an island platform serving two tracks.

Surroundings
Kurama-dera
Mount Kurama
Yuki Shrine

Adjacent station

References

Railway stations in Kyoto Prefecture
Railway stations in Japan opened in 1929